The Kwiambal are an Aboriginal Australian people of New South Wales.

Name
The ethnonym is formed from their word for 'no', transcribed by early ethnographers as quie/koi, and the suffix bal, which denotes a tribal grouping.

Country
Norman Tindale assigned to the Kwiambal a territorial domain of roughly  around the lower Severn River and in the area of Ashford and Fraser's Creek. To their south were the Jukambal

Tribal status
In his account of a journey south of Brisbane in 1855, the Presbyterian missionary William Ridley wrote
I came down the Gwydir to the Bundarra, and over that river to Warialda. The aborigines I found at Warialda, twelve in number, speak Kamilaroi as well as Uolaroi; but they were the last I met who spoke to me in the former language. A day's journey northward from Warialda, I found blacks speaking Yukumba; and on the Macintyre, 70 miles from Warialda, Pikumbul is the prevailing language.

Tindale intuited that the geographic context a day's riding from Warialda would imply that these people, whom Ridley called Yukumba, must have been Kwiambal. At the same time he did not exclude the possibility that they may have been a horde of the Jukambal. The objections to merging the Kwiambal with Jukambal, or vice versa, were twofold: the size of their estimated territory was too large to refer to a clan or band society, and, secondly, the ethnonym Kwiambal has a -bal tribal suffix.

Alternative names
 Koi
 Kweembul
 Queenbulla
 Quieumble

Source:

Some words
 goone (whiteman)
 kuppenea. (mother)
 maroni. (kangaroo)
 menni. (tame dog)
 parpinga. (father)

Source:

Notes

Citations

Sources

Aboriginal peoples of New South Wales